Tad DeLorm (born in Trier) is a retired German-born American football (soccer) goalkeeper who played three seasons in the North American Soccer League and three in the American Soccer League. He now works at Classical Magnet School in Hartford, Connecticut. He is a soccer and baseball coach.

College
DeLorm attended Keene State College where he was a 1977 NAIA first team All American.  That year, Keene went to the NAIA national men's soccer championship where they lost to Quincy University.  In December 1996, Keene State inducted DeLorm into the school's Athletic Hall of Fame.

Professional
In 1978, DeLorm turned professional with the Colorado Caribous in the North American Soccer League.  He played two games, both as a substitute.  The Caribous moved to Atlanta where they were renamed the Atlanta Chiefs for the 1979 season.  In 1980, DeLorm moved to the Minnesota Kicks.  In 1981, he signed with the Detroit Express of the American Soccer League.  He played for them through at least 1983.  In 1982, he was the ASL's top goalkeeper.

Yearly awards
 ASL Leading Goalkeeper: 1982

References

External links
NASL stats
Chiefs indoor
Kicks indoor

1955 births
American Soccer League (1933–1983) players
Atlanta Chiefs players
Colorado Caribous players
Detroit Express (1981–1983) players
Minnesota Kicks players
North American Soccer League (1968–1984) players
North American Soccer League (1968–1984) indoor players
Living people
Sportspeople from Trier
Association football goalkeepers
Footballers from Rhineland-Palatinate
American soccer players